Art fair may refer to:

 Art exhibition, a space in which art objects meet an audience
 Arts festival, a festival that can encompass a wide range of art genres
 The Art Fair, a 1996 American novel by David Lipsky